This list of samples of serif typefaces details standard serif fonts used in printing, classical typesetting and printing.


List of samples

Additional serif typefaces

 Algerian
 Allegro
 Aurora
 Belwe Roman
 Book Antiqua (Monotype's imitation of Palatino)
 Berkeley Old Style
 Candida
 Cartier
 Century Old Style
 Charis SIL
 Cholla Slab
 Clearface
 Concrete Roman
 Corona
 Doves Type
 Egyptienne
 Elephant
 Excelsior
 Fairfield
 Guardian Egyptian
 Hightower Text
 Imprint
 Lexicon
 Lexia
 Memphis
 Miller
 Renault
 Roman (vector font included with Windows 3.1)
 Skeleton Antique
 Sylfaen
 Tower
 XITS

See also
Fixedsys
List of display typefaces
List of monospaced typefaces
List of sans serif typefaces
List of script typefaces

 
Serif
Serif